Lepsény is a village in Fejér county, Hungary.

External links

  in Hungarian
 Street map 

Populated places in Fejér County